Events during the year 1985 in Northern Ireland.

Incumbents
 Secretary of State - Douglas Hurd (until 3 September), Tom King (from 3 September)

Events
28 February - 1985 Newry mortar attack: The Provisional Irish Republican Army carries out a mortar attack on the Royal Ulster Constabulary police station in Corry Square at Newry, killing nine officers in the highest loss of life for the RUC on a single day.
3 July - Thousands of Loyalists demonstrate against a proposed Royal Ulster Constabulary (RUC) decision to re-route a church parade away from the 'Tunnel' (the Catholic Obins Street) area of Portadown.
6 July - RUC decide to allow a church parade through the area, but impose a ban on similar marches on 12 and 13 July.
7 July - Serious clashes occur in Portadown between Nationalist protesters and police as the parade of 2,500 Orangeman, passes through the Catholic Obins Street. Eight policemen are injured and three people arrested.
12–13 July - Further rioting in Portadown, this time between Loyalists and the RUC, as the Orange Order and Royal Black Institution parades are re-routed from the 'Tunnel' area. 52 policemen are injured and 43 people arrested during these two days of rioting.
15 November - Taoiseach Garret FitzGerald, and the British Prime Minister, Margaret Thatcher, sign the Anglo-Irish Agreement at Hillsborough Castle, County Down. Treasury Minister Ian Gow resigns in protest at the deal.
23 November - A mass rally of Democratic Unionist and Ulster Unionist Party members against the Anglo-Irish Agreement is held outside Belfast City Hall under the slogan Ulster Says No.

Arts and literature
24 October - Anne Devlin's play Ourselves Alone is performed for the first time.
Castleward Opera stages its first annual opera festival at Castle Ward, a National Trust house near Strangford in County Down, with a performance of Così fan tutte.
Gerry Anderson begins broadcasting on BBC Radio Foyle from Derry.
The last native speaker of Rathlin Island Irish dies.

Sport

Football
Irish League
Winners: Linfield

Irish Cup
Winners: Glentoran 1 - 1, 1 - 0 Linfield

Derry City F.C. joins the League of Ireland, having been out of senior football since 1972.

Motorcycling
Robert Dunlop wins 250cc race at the Cookstown 100.

Rugby Union
30 March - The Irish rugby team wins the Triple Crown and Five Nations Championship at Lansdowne Road.  They beat England 13.

Snooker
28 April - Dennis Taylor wins the Embassy World Snooker Championship.

Births
1 January - Steven Davis, footballer
1 February - Dean Shiels, footballer
3 March - Sam Morrow, footballer
29 May - Jeff Hughes, footballer
15 June - Nadine Coyle, singer
29 June - Conall Murtagh, footballer
23 July - William Dunlop, motorcycle racer (killed in crash 2018)
2 September - Marissa Callaghan, footballer
3 October - Kevin Seaward, marathon runner
14 October
 Emmet Friars, footballer
 Alanna Nihell, boxer
2 November - John Lowry-Corry, Viscount Corry
18 November - Jonny Harkness, footballer

Deaths

See also
1985 in Scotland
1985 in Wales

References

 
Northern Ireland